The Humboldt River is a river of Santa Catarina state in southeastern Brazil. There is plentiful gold and silver, which makes this river a very large attraction for tourists. It merges with the Novo River to form the Itapoçu River.

See also
List of rivers of Santa Catarina

References

Rivers of Santa Catarina (state)